Arriaga-Lakua was a Spanish village in Álava, Basque Country and is at present one quarter of Vitoria-Gasteiz.

Geographical features
Only Abetxuko is located further north than Arriaga-Lakua.

History
The first written reference to Arriaga-Lakua is in a document from 1025, located in the cartulary of San Millán de la Cogolla (also known as Reja de San Millán).

The village was most significant for its close proximity to a place called "Campo de Lakua" ("Field of Lakua"), where the institutions that ruled the Álava people conducted meetings. The joint institution that governed the "Lordship of Alava" was responsible for uniting the nobles of Alava and received the name "Brotherhood of Arriaga".

Arriaga-Lakua was one of the ancient villages of Vitoria-Gasteiz that came to depend on the main city at an early age. In 1258 the Voluntaria Entrega was produced, stating that the Brotherhood of Arriaga were required to relinquish their power over the Lordship of Álava to Alfonso XI, the king of Castilla, in exchange for maintaining their privileges. Eight villages were eventually given to the king, including Arriaga and the city of Vitoria-Gasteiz. Following this transfer, Arriaga-Lakua continued to host the "Juntas Generales de Álava" ("General Meetings of Álava").

During the Napoleonic Wars, a fierce conflict known as the "Battle of Vitoria" occurred in Arriaga, with the opposing forces fighting to take control of the bridge of the Zadorra tributary.

By the early 1960s, Arriaga-Lakua remained a small town situated at the gates of Vitoria-Gasteiz, with nearly 300 inhabitants. Subsequent urban expansion commenced in the north-west area and Vitoria-Gasteiz began to surround the village. During the 1960s and 1970s, buildings were constructed, as the village became a quarter of Vitoria-Gasteiz.

Modern era

Very little remains of the original town—the most significant remnants are the parish church and the Hermitage of San Juan de Arriaga.

Arriaga-Lakua is under the authority of the Gobiernos Vasco (Basque Government), and is divided into the following sections:
 Lakua 1
 Lakua 2
 Lakuabizkarra
 Lakua 12
 Lakua 13 or Lakua-Arriaga

Over 27,000 people live there. It is the biggest district in the city and tops its delinquency rankings. Per-capita data reveals the ranking is because of the quarter's relatively large population.

Galician, Asturian and Andalusian cultural centers are located at the back of the "Gernikako Arbola" street. There is a Christian Jehovah's Witness center.

Notables
Raúl Fuentes Cuenca became a finalist representing Spain in Eurovision 2000.

Events
The quarter holds an annual festival and offers the Napoleonic market.

External links
 http://ipar-arriaga.blogspot.com.es

Populated places in Álava